Charles Bryant Lang Jr., A.S.C. (March 27, 1902, Bluff, Utah – April 3, 1998, Santa Monica, California) was an American cinematographer.

Career
Early in his career, he worked with the Akeley camera, a gyroscope-mounted "pancake" camera designed by Carl Akeley for outdoor action shots. Lang's first credits were as co-cinematographer on the silent films The Night Patrol (1926) and The Loves of Ricardo (1927).

After completing Tom Sawyer for Paramount Pictures in 1930, he continued working at the studio for more than twenty years. The style of lighting he introduced in A Farewell to Arms became heavily identified with all of Paramount's films during the 1930s and 1940s, though he occasionally worked for other studios, for instance on The Ghost and Mrs. Muir (1947).

In 1951, he began the second phase of his career, this time as a free-lance cinematographer. His credits include The Big Heat (1953) with Glenn Ford and Lee Marvin, Sabrina (1954) with Humphrey Bogart and William Holden, Gunfight at the O.K. Corral (1957) with Burt Lancaster and Kirk Douglas, The Matchmaker (1958), Some Like It Hot (1959) with Marilyn Monroe and Jack Lemmon, The Magnificent Seven (1960) with Steve McQueen, One-Eyed Jacks (1961) with Marlon Brando, How the West Was Won (1962) in Cinerama, Charade (1963) with Cary Grant and Audrey Hepburn, Bob & Carol & Ted & Alice (1969), and Butterflies Are Free (1972).

Lang received a Lifetime Achievement Award from the American Society of Cinematographers in 1991, for a career which included at least 114 feature films.

Academy Awards
Lang won an Oscar the second time he was nominated, early in his career; he received a total of 18 nominations, tying with Leon Shamroy for the most Academy Award for Best Cinematography nominations.

Wins
 A Farewell to Arms (1932)

Nominations
Lang also received Oscar nominations for the following films:

 The Right to Love (1930)
 Arise, My Love (1940)
 Sundown (1941)
 So Proudly We Hail! (1943)
 The Uninvited (1944)
 The Ghost and Mrs. Muir (1947)
 A Foreign Affair (1948)
 Sudden Fear (1952)
 Sabrina (1954)
 Queen Bee (1955)
 Separate Tables (1958)
 Some Like It Hot (1959)
 The Facts of Life (1960)
 One-Eyed Jacks (1961)
 How the West Was Won (1962)
 Bob & Carol & Ted & Alice (1969)
 Butterflies Are Free (1972)

Personal life
His father, Charles B. Lang Sr., was a photographer and explorer of cliff ruins in Utah and the southwestern U.S.

Lang died of pneumonia.
One of Lang's granddaughters is actress Katherine Kelly Lang, who is best known for her role as Brooke Logan Forrester on the CBS soap opera The Bold and the Beautiful. Her mother is Lang's daughter, actress Judy Lang.

References

External links

Charles Lang at the  Directory of Great Cinematographers (NL)

1902 births
1998 deaths
American cinematographers
Best Cinematographer Academy Award winners
People from San Juan County, Utah
Deaths from pneumonia in California